Elvin! is a jazz album by drummer Elvin Jones recorded in 1961 and 1962 and released on the Riverside label. It features Jones playing in a group with his brothers, trumpeter Thad (here playing cornet) and pianist Hank, along with tenor saxophonist Frank Foster, flautist Frank Wess and bassist Art Davis.

Reception
The Allmusic review stated "straight-ahead with a strong Count Basie feel. Jones is still recognizable on the fairly obscure material (only "You Are Too Beautiful" qualifies as a standard) and shows that he can cook in the fairly conventional setting. All of the musicians are in fine form" and awarded the album 3½ stars.

Track listing
All compositions by Elvin Jones except as indicated
 "Lady Luck" (Jones, Frank Wess) - 6:19 
 "Buzz-At" (Thad Jones) - 6:31 
 "Shadowland" (Sara Cassey) - 4:06 
 "Pretty Brown" (Ernie Wilkins) - 3:30 
 "Ray-El" - 8:03 
 "Four and Six" (Oliver Nelson) - 5:01 
 "You Are Too Beautiful" (Lorenz Hart, Richard Rodgers) - 4:20

Personnel
Elvin Jones - drums 
Thad Jones - cornet (tracks 1–3, 5 & 7)
Frank Wess - flute (tracks 1–3, 5 & 7)
Frank Foster - tenor saxophone (tracks 1-3 & 5) 
Hank Jones - piano
Art Davis - bass

References

Elvin Jones albums
1962 albums
Riverside Records albums
Albums produced by Orrin Keepnews